Anolis nelsoni, the Swan Islands anole or Nelson's anole, is a species of lizard in the family Dactyloidae. The species is found on the Swan Islands in Honduras.

On a videography expedition carried out in May 2022 by Biologists Daniel Germer, Estefanía Cálix and the Physician Alfonso Auerbach, Anolis nelsoni was found to be an abundant species on Great Swan island. About one Anolis nelsoni was seen on every other tree and occasionally inside the infrastructure.

References

Anoles
Reptiles described in 1914
Endemic fauna of Honduras
Reptiles of Honduras
Taxa named by Thomas Barbour